Cruise Lines International Association (CLIA) is a cruise line trade association. It merged with International Council of Cruise Lines (ICCL) in 2006, forming an expanded organization incorporating the existing functions of both organizations. The merged organization, which uses the CLIA name, is located in Washington, D.C.

Established in 1975, Cruise Lines International Association (CLIA) is the world's largest cruise industry trade association based on the number of passenger cruise ships operated by its members. However, there is a significant proportion of the wider cruise industry which does not subscribe to CLIA's member body and which transports a considerable volume of passengers. There is no regulatory requirement for cruise operators to subscribe to the trade body, each year a significant number of cruise passengers are transported on a growing number of non-member vessels. The trade body has no representation across the entirety of Africa, for example.

CLIA works with the Global Sustainable Tourism Council (GSTC) to help port cities analyze how to manage tourism flows and map out a road map for a sustainable future. To date, the industry has partnered with the City of Dubrovnik, Corfu and Heraklion to collaborate and identify best practices for long-term destination management to the benefit of residents and visitors alike. While it is unclear what level of support is delivered, CLIA is also a corporate sponsor of the Mercy Ship
program.

The trade body's marketing and education activities may be considered activities more closely related to influence or lobbying, however the organization holds no powers to set or enforce laws or regulations.

In response to the COVID-19 pandemic, CLIA voluntarily suspended sailings out of US ports on 13 March 2020, one day before the Centers for Disease Control and Prevention issued a no-sail order. However, COVID-19 outbreaks continued on ships already at sea. Whilst CLIA had drafted a plan to hire a global rescue team to extract infected passengers, by 6 April this had not been realized and public health authorities had to intervene to evacuate critically ill people from ships.

Membership

CLIA has several categories of membership:

 50+ Cruise Line Members – From ocean to specialty cruise ships, CLIA member lines represent more than 95 percent of global cruise capacity.
 350+ Executive Partner Members – Key suppliers and partners to the cruise lines.
 13,000+ Global Travel Agency and 50,000+ Travel Agent Members.
 CLIA Cruise Line Members serve more than 30 million passengers annually.

Member lines
As of July 2020, CLIA Cruise Line Members are made up of the following lines:

Global cruise line members 
 AmaWaterways
 AIDA Cruises
 American Cruise Lines
 Avalon Waterways
 Azamara Club Cruises
 Carnival Cruise Line
 Celebrity Cruises
 Celestyal Cruises
 Costa Cruises
 Crystal Cruises
 Cunard Line
 Disney Cruise Line
 Emerald Waterways
 Holland America Line
 MSC Cruises
 Mystic Cruises
 Norwegian Cruise Line
 Oceania Cruises
 Pearl Seas Cruises
 PONANT Yacht Cruises and Expeditions
 Princess Cruises
 Regent Seven Seas Cruises
 Riviera Travel River Cruises
 Royal Caribbean International
 Scenic Luxury Cruises & Tours
 Seabourn
 SeaDream Yacht Club
 Silversea Cruises
 TUI Cruises
 Uniworld Boutique River Cruise Collection
 Virgin Voyages
 Windstar Cruises

European regional cruise line members 
A'Rosa

Amadeus by Luftner

Belmond Cruises

CroisiEurope

Hapag Lloyd Cruises

Marella Cruises

P&O Cruises UK

Pullmantur

Riviera Travel

Saga

Shearings Holiday

Australasia regional cruise line members 
APT Group

Aqua Expeditions

Coral Expeditions

Dream Cruises

Ganges Voyager

P&O Cruises Australia

Riviera Travel

Star Cruises

Travelmarvel

References

External links
 CLIA's Official Web site

Cruise lines
Trade associations based in the United States
Organizations established in 1975
1975 establishments in the United States
Travel-related organizations